William Ian Brown (6 September 1910 – 15 January 1993) was a professional footballer who played a number of positions in the Football League for Brentford, Luton Town, Leyton Orient and Huddersfield Town.

Career 
Brown began his career in non-League football with Fairbairn House and Silvertown, before joining Third Division South club Luton Town in 1930. He made shy of 50 league appearances in four seasons at Kenilworth Road, before moving to the top flight with Huddersfield Town in 1934. He was used sparingly before joining First Division rivals Brentford in March 1937 as a replacement for Dai Richards. He quickly became a regular with the Bees, playing in both full back positions, at half back and centre forward during the  years before the Second World War intervened. Brown remained with Brentford during the war, with his 246 appearances being the most by any Brentford player during wartime. He dropped down to the Fourth Division to sign for Leyton Orient in May 1947, before ending his career in the Southern League with Chingford Town the following year.

Career statistics

Honours 
Brentford
 London War Cup: 1941–42

References

1910 births
1993 deaths
Footballers from Silvertown
English footballers
English Football League players
Luton Town F.C. players
Huddersfield Town A.F.C. players
Brentford F.C. players
Chingford Town F.C. players
Southern Football League players
Leyton Orient F.C. players
Association football utility players
Association football fullbacks
Association football wing halves
Association football forwards